Farkhunda Muhtaj (born November 15, 1997) is an Afghan international footballer, who plays as a midfielder with Dutch club Fortuna Sittard in the women's Eredivisie. She was the captain of the Afghanistan women's national football team and was a key figure in the evacuation of the Afghanistan girls youth team from Afghanistan following the Taliban takeover.

Early life 
During the Afghan Civil War, Muhtaj's family fled from Afghanistan and went to Pakistan, where they lived without valid papers, and was where she was born. Her family then moved to the Toronto, Ontario suburb of Scarborough in Canada in 2000, when she was two.

University career 
From 2015 to 2019, she attended York University, playing for the women's soccer team, serving as team captain in 2018 and 2019. She scored her first goal on October 25, 2015, against Algoma University. In 2018, she led the OUA with 11 assists. In 2019, she was named an OUA West Division First-team All-Star for the first time as the Lions won the OUA championship. In September 2020, she continued with the team as assistant coach.

Club career 
She began playing for Vaughan Azzurri in League1 Ontario in 2015. She made six league appearances in 2016, eight league appearances in 2017, and four league appearances in 2018.

In 2019, she began playing for Durham United FA making 13 league appearances.

In 2021, she returned to Vaughan Azzurri, making seven league appearances.

In 2021, following her work helping evacuate the Afghanistan youth girls team, she was invited to train with Portuguese club Benfica and also met with Spanish club Barcelona, as well as speaking to the members of the Barcelona Academy.

On March 3, 2022, she signed with Fatih Vatan S.K. of the Turkish Women's Football Super League.

On July 30, 2022, she signed with Dutch club Fortuna Sittard, a new expansion side in the women's Eredivisie.

International career 
Muhtaj was a member of the Afghanistan women's national football team since 2016, eventually becoming team captain in 2018. She scored a goal against India on December 27, 2016, at the 2016 SAFF Women's Championship. In the summer of 2021, she spoke with the Afghanistan Football Federation about having the team compete in the FIFA Women's World Cup qualification for the first time, however, the 2021 Taliban offensive in Afghanistan put an end to that.

International goals

Operation Soccer Balls 
Following the takeover of Afghanistan by the Taliban in August 2021, women's rights were severely restricted, including the banning of female sports. Muhtaj, who lived in Canada and was the captain of the Afghanistan women's team, was part of a group that was formed to help a group of 80 people composed of the 26 members Afghani female youth team aged 14 to 16 and their families flee the country. The Afghanistan Football Federation reached out to Muhtaj on August 14, who joined the girls' WhatsApp group to help co-ordinate the departure, serving as the only point of contact for the group. The rescue mission, which was called Operation Soccer Balls, was coordinated with the Taliban through an international coalition of former U.S. military and intelligence officials, United States Senator Chris Coons, United States allies, and humanitarian groups. The mission initially suffered multiple setbacks, including several failed rescue attempts and a suicide bombing carried out by Islamic State militants, with the group having to go into hiding after being unable to leave before the August 31 deadline for safe passage out of the country had passed. The group landed and was granted asylum in Portugal on September 19. On September 29, she arrived in Portugal to meet the group. She remained in Portugal with the team to help guide them. A second evacuation flight bringing over other players and additional family members arrived in November.

Personal 
Muhtaj is an Ontario Certified Teacher after having graduated from York University's Bachelor of Education program. She has a National C coaching license.

On the Italian television show Crush - La storia di Tamina, Muhtaj is the idol of the main character of the show (Tamina), a 13-year old Afghan girl who loves to play soccer and has a poster of Muhtaj in her bedroom.

References

External links 

Farkhunda Muhtaj at Turkish Football Federation

Living people
1997 births
Women's association football midfielders
Afghan women's footballers
Afghanistan women's international footballers
Vaughan Azzurri (women) players
League1 Ontario (women) players
York Lions soccer players
York University alumni
Afghan women's rights activists
Afghan women activists
Afghan emigrants to Canada
Pickering FC (women) players
Afghan expatriate sportspeople in Turkey
Expatriate women's footballers in Turkey
Turkish Women's Football Super League players
Fatih Vatan Spor players
Sportspeople from Scarborough, Toronto
Canadian expatriate women's soccer players
Canadian expatriate sportspeople in Turkey
Soccer players from Toronto
Afghan expatriate sportspeople in the Netherlands
Canadian expatriate sportspeople in the Netherlands
Expatriate women's footballers in the Netherlands
Fortuna Sittard (women) players
Eredivisie (women) players